Slovenia was represented in the Eurovision Song Contest 2005 by Omar Naber with the song "Stop". The song was originally a dynamic ballad, but was turned into a symphonic metal song for Eurovision. The song is written and composed by Urša Vlašič.

Before Eurovision

EMA 2005 
EMA 2005 was the 10th edition of the Slovenian national final format Evrovizijska Melodija (EMA). The competition was used by RTV Slovenija to select Slovenia's entry for the Eurovision Song Contest 2005 and was broadcast on TV Slovenija 1, Radio Val 202, Radio Maribor and online via the broadcaster's website rtvslo.si.

Competing entries 
Artists and composers were able to submit their entries to the broadcaster between 16 October 2004 and 10 December 2004. 103 entries were received by the broadcaster during the submission period. An expert committee consisting of Andrej Karoli (music editor for Radia Slovenija), Mario Galunič (television presenter), Zoran Predin (singer-songwriter), Andrej Šifrer (singer and composer), Jaka Pucihar (composer) and Matjaž Kosi (songwriter and music producer) selected thirteen artists and songs for the competition from the received submissions, while an additional entry was provided by Omar Naber, the first season's winner of the talent show Bitka Talentov, who was directly invited by RTV Slovenija for the competition. The competing artists were announced on 22 December 2004. Among the competing artists were former Slovenian Eurovision contestants Regina who represented Slovenia in 1996 and Nuša Derenda who represented Slovenia in 2001.

Final 
EMA 2005 took place on 6 February 2005 at the RTV Slovenija Studio 1 in Ljubljana, hosted by Saša Einsiedler and Saša Gerdej. In addition to the performances of the competing entries, 2004 Eurovision winner Ruslana and 2004 Serbian and Montenegrin Eurovision entrant Željko Joksimović performed as guests. The winner was selected over two rounds of public voting. In the first round, the top three entries were selected to proceed to the second round. In the second round, "Stop" performed by Omar Naber was selected as the winner.

At Eurovision
Because Slovenia failed to qualify in 2004 Omar was forced to compete in the Eurovision semi-final. "Stop" was performed in the semi-final of the contest but failed to qualify for the final, finishing in 12th place with 69 points.

The spokesperson who revealed Slovenia's votes for other countries was TV SLO host Katarina Čas.

Voting

Points awarded to Slovenia

Points awarded by Slovenia

References

2005
Countries in the Eurovision Song Contest 2005
Eurovision